Allan Borgvardt (born 5 June 1980) is a former Danish footballer.

Borgvardt got his senior breakthrough with Aarhus Gymnastikforening (AGF), playing 62 games for the club in the Danish Superliga from 1999 to 2002. He later played seven matches for Viking in Tippeligaen, before he played for Norwegian First Division side Bryne and Sandnes Ulf. He then played in Sweden for IF Sylvia and Svärtinge SK.

Borgvardt has played 15 games for various Danish youth selections, including 8 games and 5 goals for the Denmark national under-19 football team.

References

External links 
 Profile at Eliteprospects

1980 births
Living people
Danish men's footballers
Denmark youth international footballers
Association football forwards
Esbjerg fB players
Aarhus Gymnastikforening players
Fimleikafélag Hafnarfjarðar players
Viking FK players
Bryne FK players
Sandnes Ulf players
IF Sylvia players
Danish Superliga players
Eliteserien players
Norwegian First Division players
Úrvalsdeild karla (football) players
Danish expatriate men's footballers
Expatriate footballers in Iceland
Expatriate footballers in Norway
Expatriate footballers in Sweden
Danish expatriate sportspeople in Iceland
Danish expatriate sportspeople in Norway
Danish expatriate sportspeople in Sweden